The 55th Rolex 24 at Daytona was an International Motor Sports Association (IMSA)-sanctioned 24-hour automobile endurance race for prototype and grand touring sports cars held at the Daytona International Speedway combined road course in Daytona Beach, Florida from January 28 to 29, 2017. It was the first of twelve events in the 2017 IMSA SportsCar Championship, the 55th 24 Hours of Daytona, and the first in the four-round North American Endurance Cup.

João Barbosa started from the pole position for Mustang Sampling Racing by lapping quickest in qualifying, and held the lead for most of the opening hour until teammate Dane Cameron of Whelen Engineering Racing passed him. Wayne Taylor Racing joined in, trading the lead with the Mustang Sampling Racing, VisitFlorida Racing, Extreme Speed Motorsports and Whelen Engineering Racing teams. Ricky Taylor collided with Filipe Albuquerque with around seven minutes to go, building a large lead while Albuquerque began to track him down. On the final lap of the race, Albuquerque reduced Taylor's lead by four seconds but was unable to reach Taylor in time to challenge for the lead. Max Angelelli, Jeff Gordon, and Jordan Taylor joined Ricky Taylor after 659 laps to lead in the Prototype Drivers' and Teams' Championships. VisitFlorida Racing's Marc Goossens, René Rast and Renger van der Zande completed the podium one lap behind in third.

The Prototype Challenge (PC) category was won by the Performance Tech Motorsports Oreca FLM09 vehicle, shared by Nicholas Boulle, James French, Kyle Masson, and Patricio O'Ward after leading the category's final 514 laps. BAR1 Motorsport's No. 26 entry of David Cheng, Trent Hindman, Adam Merzon, Johnny Mowlem, and Tom Papadopoulos finished 22 laps behind in second place; third was the sister BAR1 car of Chapman Ducote, Mark Kvamme, Buddy Rice, Gustavo Yacamán, and Don Yount. Ford Chip Ganassi Racing won the Grand Touring Le Mans (GTLM) category with a Ford GT shared by Sébastien Bourdais, Joey Hand, and Dirk Müller by 2.988 seconds over the Porsche 911 RSR driven by Frédéric Makowiecki, Patrick Pilet, and Dirk Werner which defeated the third-place Risi Competizione Ferrari 488 GTE of James Calado, Giancarlo Fisichella, and Toni Vilander by 0.091 seconds. The Alegra Motorsports team of Michael Christensen, Carlos de Quesada, Michael de Quesada, Jesse Lazare, and Daniel Morad won the Grand Touring Daytona (GTD) class in a Porsche 911 GT3 R by 0.293 seconds after Christensen overtook Montaplast by Land-Motorsport's Audi R8 LMS of Connor De Phillippi, Jules Gounon, Christopher Mies, and Jeffrey Schmidt in the race's final hour. The Riley Motorsports – Team AMG-fielded Mercedes-AMG GT3, driven by Jeroen Bleekemolen, Adam Christodoulou, Ben Keating, and Mario Farnbacher, completed the class podium in third place.

Background

Preview

NASCAR founder Bill France Sr., who built Daytona International Speedway in 1959, conceived of the 24 Hours of Daytona to attract European sports-car endurance racing to the United States and provide international exposure to the speedway. It is informally considered part of the Triple Crown of Endurance Racing, with the 12 Hours of Sebring and the 24 Hours of Le Mans.

International Motor Sports Association (IMSA) president Scott Atherton confirmed that the race was part of the 2017 IMSA SportsCar Championship schedule in August 2016. It was the fourth year in a row that the race was part of the series calendar, and the 55th 24 Hours of Daytona. The race was the first of 2017's twelve scheduled IMSA automobile endurance races, and the first of four North American Endurance Cup (NAEC) events. It was held at the 12-turn,  Daytona International Speedway in Daytona Beach, Florida from January 28 to 29.

Entry list
Fifty-five cars were entered in the race, and most entries were in the Grand Touring Daytona (GTD) class.  Extreme Speed Motorsports (ESM), the 2016 winners, returned to defend its title. Daytona marked the debut of IMSA's Daytona Prototype International (DPi) cars, replacing the Daytona Prototype (DP), competing with the revised Automobile Club de l'Ouest-regulated Le Mans Prototype 2 (LMP2) cars in the Prototype category. Wayne Taylor Racing (WTR), Mustang Sampling Racing and Whelen Engineering Racing (WER) each fielded one Cadillac DPi-V.R car, and ESM entered two Nissan Onroak DPi vehicles. Mazda Motorsports sent two Mazda RT24-P chassis, and VisitFlorida Racing entered one Riley Mk. 30 LMP2-specification car. Oreca was represented by three 07-Gibson cars, with one each fielded by JDC-Miller Motorsports (moving from the Prototype Challenge (PC) class), DragonSpeed and Daytona first-timer Rebellion Racing. The PC category was composed of five Oreca FLM09s: two each from BAR1 Motorsports and Starworks Motorsport, and one from Performance Tech Motorsports.

GT Le Mans (GTLM) consisted of 11 vehicles from five brands. Porsche's GT Team debuted the mid-engine 911 RSR, and Ford Chip Ganassi Racing (CGR) and its UK division each fielded two Ford GTs. Team RLL entered two BMW M6 GTLMs, and Corvette Racing fielded two C7.Rs. Ferrari was represented by a Ferrari 488 GTE, fielded by Risi Competizione. GTD had 27 entrants from nine GT3 manufacturers. Lamborghini was the most-numerous brand in GTD, with eight Huracáns: two from GRT Grasser Racing Team, and one each from Change Racing, DAC Motorsports, Dream Racing Competition, Ebimotors, Konrad Motorsport and Paul Miller Racing. Porsche was represented by five 911 GT3 Rs, with one each from Alegra Motorsports, CORE Autosport, Manthey Racing, Park Place Motorsports and The Racer's Group. A mix of teams and brands made up the rest of the GTD field. They included three Audi R8 LMS (one each from Alex Job Racing, Montaplast by Land-Motorsport and Stevenson Motorsports) and three Mercedes-AMG GT3s from Riley Motorsports – Team AMG, Riley Motorsports – WeatherTech Racing and SunEnergy1 Racing. Michael Shank Racing joined Acura for two debuting Acura NSX GT3, and 3GT Racing gave two Lexus RC F GT3s their competition debut at Daytona. Scuderia Corsa and Spirit of Race entered one Ferrari 488 GT3 apiece. There was one Vantage GT3 from Aston Martin Racing, and one BMW M6 GT3 from Turner Motorsport.

Each car was driven by two full-time entrants, along with one NAEC racer and one or two extra competitors. The additional participants were recruited from a number of racing categories, including the FIA World Endurance Championship (such as Neel Jani for Rebellion Racing and Brendon Hartley for ESM), the Supercars Championship (such as Shane van Gisbergen for Riley Motorsports – WeatherTech Racing), the IndyCar Series (such as Scott Dixon for CGR and James Hinchcliffe for Mazda Motorsports), the Deutsche Tourenwagen Masters (such as Robert Wickens for Starworks Motorsport), and Super GT (such as Andrea Caldarelli for Paul Miller Racing). Some drivers competed at Daytona on a one-off basis, such as four-time NASCAR Cup Series champion Jeff Gordon and Formula E racer Sam Bird. Seb Morris joined WER after winning the Sunoco Whelen Challenge for British GT Championship, Radical Team Challenge and Radical European Masters entrants.

Pre-test balance of performance
The week before the circuit's three-day test session, the IMSA altered the balance of performance in all four categories to achieve parity. All Prototype entries had  of baseline weight and  fuel-cell capacity. The PC category had no performance changes. The Ford GT received a boost-ratio-curve increase to ease performance, the Aston Martin Vantage had  of minimum weight added for heavier handling, and the Lamborghini Huracán's power was reduced by a  air-restrictor reduction to two  openings. The Ligier JS P217, Oreca 07 or Riley Mk. 30 LMP2 machines had no performance changes. The GTLM-category Porsche 911 RSR had its minimum rear-wing angle set at zero degrees. The GTD and PC classes had no performance alterations.

Testing 
The 55 entries participated in a seven-session, three-day test at Daytona from January 6 to 8 as race preparation. Some drivers, including Corey Lewis, Matt McMurry, Gustavo Menezes and Alessandro Pier Guidi, missed the test because they were racing in the Asian Le Mans Series's 4 Hours of Thailand. The first day saw warm temperatures and low winds. Neel Jani set the first session's best lap (1:39.164) in Rebellion's No. 13 Oreca car, improving by 0.004 seconds in the second session. Mathias Beche was second in JDC-Miller's No. 85 entry. The fastest DPi car was WTR's No. 10 Ricky Taylor Cadillac in third, followed by José Gutiérrez's PR1/Mathiasen No. 52 Ligier and Nicolas Lapierre's No. 81 DragonSpeed Oreca in fourth and fifth. Johnny Mowlem's No. 26 BAR1 Oreca car led PC with a 1:42.701 lap. A crash by Clark Toppe in Performance Tech's No. 38 car against the Bus Stop chicane barrier heavily damaged the car after an hour, but Toppe was uninjured. Jan Magnussen led the morning session in GTLM with a 1:44.760 lap in Corvette's No. 3 C7.R, and continued to lead in the afternoon session over Dirk Müller's and Andy Priaulx's Nos. 66 and 67 Fords. Andrew Davis' No. 57 Stevenson Audi led GTD.

Jani again set the fastest overall lap (1:38.944) on the second day; Tristan Nunez's No. 55 Mazda was second, Ben Hanley' DragonSpeed car was third, and JDC-Miller's Oreca car was fourth. WTR's Cadillac, driven by Jordan Taylor, finished fifth. Pato O'Ward led in PC at 1:43.119 driving Performance Tech's car. Dixon's No. 67 Ford led in GTLM with a 1:44.558 lap during the afternoon session, two-tenths of a second faster than Magnunssen's second-placed No. 3 Corvette. A serious fire, caused by a fuel line (allowing fuel to escape and ignite on the warm engine compartment) in Corvette's No. 4 C7.R driven by Marcel Fässler into NASCAR turn two caused him to stop in the infield with front left-corner damage. Fässler, evaluated and released from the infield medical center, was unhurt. Corvette Racing withdrew from the test to investigate the fire's cause. Christopher Mies' No. 29 Land Audi lapped at 1:47.723 to lead GTD. A stop on the track by João Barbosa's No. 5 Mustang Sampling Cadillac and a collision between Patrick Pilet's No. 911 Porsche and the No. 98 Aston Martin, which damaged Pilet's left front suspension, disrupted the test.

The third and final day saw DragonSpeed's Hanley lap fastest overall (1:38.343), 0.020 seconds faster than Jonathan Bomarito's second-place No. 55 Mazda. Sébastien Buemi placed the Rebellion Oreca third; the PR1/Matheisen car finished fourth, and Barbosa's Mustang Sampling Cadillac was the fastest DPi entry in fifth place. Performance Tech continued to lead in PC after a lap by James French. GTLM was led by Ryan Briscoe's No. 67 Ford with a 1:44.380 lap, two-tenths of a second faster than Tony Kanaan's second-place sister No. 69 car. Sven Müller lapped fastest in GTD (1:46.810) in Manthey's No. 59 Porsche in the morning session, a tenth of a second quicker than Jeroen Bleekemolen's second-place No. 33 Riley Mercedes-AMG.

Post-test balance of performance 
After testing, the IMSA again adjusted the balance of performance in all categories. The Mazda RT24-P and Nissan Onroak DPis had their fuel tanks raised, and the Mazda and Riley Mk. 30s received minimum main-plane angles for two approved rear-wing choices. Cadillac's DPi-V.R.s rear wing assembly was moved back two degrees. The PC cars had decreased fuel capacity and shorter hose restrictors. All five GTLM cars had minimum rear-wing angles altered and refueling flow restrictors installed. All GTD-class machinery received weight adjustments. The Audi R8 LMS, Lamborghini Huracán, Porsche 911 R and Mercedes-AMGs had their performance decreased with air-restrictor reductions, and the fuel capacities of the Lamborghini, Lexus and Mercedes-AMG cars were reduced. All nine GTD cars had refueling flow restrictors installed.

Practice and qualifying 
Four practice sessions preceded the race's start on Saturday: three on Thursday and one on Friday. The first two one-hour sessions were on Thursday morning and afternoon. The third, that evening, lasted 90 minutes; the fourth, on Friday morning, lasted an hour.

The weather was cloudy for the first session. Cadillacs led, with the best lap set by Mustang Sampling's Christian Fittipaldi (1:38.196); this broke Alex Gurney's 2014 DP class record, and was 0.792 seconds faster than second-place WTR's Ricky Taylor. Mike Conway was third in WER's No. 31 car. The quickest LMP2 lap was set by Hanley in DragonSpeed's fourth-place entry, and Beche's JDC-Miller car was fifth. Stéphane Sarrazin stopped his Rebellion Oreca on the bank (also stopping practice with 15 minutes left), and was able to return to the pit lane. The five-vehicle PC class was led by BAR1's No. 20 Oreca, driven by Gustavo Yacamán, with a time of 1:43.668. The quickest GTLM entry was the No. 68 Ford of Olivier Pla, whose 1:44.755 lap led Laurens Vanthoor's second-place No. 912 RSR Porsche. With a 1:47.778 lap, Alessandro Balzan led the 27-car GTD class in Scuderia Corsa's No. 63 Ferrari by a tenth of a second over Christian Engelhart's No. 61 GRT Lamborghini.

In the second session, Barbosa's Mustang Sampling car lapped quickest at 1:38.549, 0.177 seconds ahead of WTR's Ricky Taylor in second and WER's Dane Cameron in third. Orecas followed in fourth to sixth place with Loïc Duval's DragonSpeed, JDC-Miller's Stephen Simpson and Rebellion's Jani. ESM's No. 22 Nissan, driven by Johannes van Overbeek, ran out of fuel entering the backstraightand was moved to the pit lane during a red flag period. A spin by Duval into the turn-one inside exit barrier gave DragonSpeed's car major left-side damage and ended practice with five minutes left. Johnny Mowlem led PC with a 1:44.175 lap in BAR1's No. 26 Oreca, and O'Ward's Performance Tech car was second. Pla's 1:44.245 lap (set with about ten minutes left) led the GTLM class in Ford's No. 66 car, almost three-tenths of a second faster than Toni Vilander's Risi Ferrari; Bill Auberlen's No. 19 BMW was third. GTD saw Patrick Lindsey's No. 73 Park Place Porsche record the quickest class lap: 1:47.135, 0.059 seconds faster than Pier Guidi's No. 51 Spirit of Race Ferrari.

In Thursday afternoon's 90-minute four-group qualifying, each category had separate 15-minute sessions. Regulations stipulated that teams nominate one qualifying driver, with the fastest laps determining each class' starting order. The IMSA arranged the grid to put Prototypes ahead of the PC, GTLM and GTD cars. Barbosa received his first career pole position with a 1:36.903 class lap record in Mustang Sampling's Cadillac. His teammate Cameron qualified the sister WER entry 0.072 seconds slower in second, and Jani's third-place Rebellion entry was the fastest Oreca car late in the session. WTR's Ricky Taylor had the pole position for most of qualifying, before Jani's lap demoted him to fourth. The ESM duo of Hartley and Ryan Dalziel qualified fifth and sixth. The DragonSpeed Oreca did not participate in qualifying because the team received permission from the IMSA to switch to the spare tub from their spare car to replace the one damaged beyond repair by Duval's second-practice-session accident.

French took the PC pole position for Performance Tech with a 1:42.559 time, set on his final lap with five minutes left. Mowlem qualified the No. 26 BAR1 entry second, and Buddy Rice's sister No. 20 car was third after leading the class for most of the session. Ford took the first three GTLM positions, led by its No. 66 car driven by Joey Hand (whose benchmark time of 1:43.473 was 0.231 seconds faster than Richard Westbrook's second-place No. 67 entry); Pla's No. 68 car was third. Pla avoided damaging his car on the tyre barrier at the International Horseshoe with less than five minutes left. The fastest Porsche was Pilet's No. 911 RSR in fourth, and the highest-placed Ferrari was Vilander's fifth-place No. 62 488 GTE. Ferrari qualified first and second in GTD, led by Spirit of Race's Pier Guidi (1:47.099) over Scuderia Corsa's Balzan by 0.018 seconds after Balzan's final lap was slower. Marco Sørensen qualified the Aston Martin third, ahead of Matteo Cairoli's fourth-place Manthey Porsche and Mirko Bortolotti's fifth-place No. 11 GRT Lamborghini.

The third practice session saw Max Angelelli lap quickest for WRT at 1:37.757, 0.148 seconds ahead of Barbosa. ESM was third and fourth after laps by Hartley and Scott Sharp, with WER's Cameron fifth. Gordon caused a stoppage early when he lost control of WTR's car. O'Ward led in PC with a 1:43.634 lap in Performance Tech's car, 0.824 seconds ahead of Remo Ruscitti in Starworks' second-place No. 8 entry. A 1:44.242 lap saw Briscoe's No. 67 Ford lead GTLM over Kévin Estre's No. 912 Porsche and Dirk Werner's No. 911 Porsche by less than a tenth of a second. Porsche paced GTD with Park Place's 911 of Jörg Bergmeister lapping 1:48.084, ahead of Robert Alon's No. 15 3GT Lexus. Jeroen Mul stopped the No. 16 Change Lamborghini on the track entering the Bus Stop chicane with half an hour left, red-flagging the practice again.

In the last practice session, Jordan Taylor went fastest for WTR (1:36.790 on his final lap). Lapierre's rebuilt DragonSpeed Oreca was second, followed by Mustang Sampling's Fittipaldi in third. Rebellion was fourth after a lap by Jani, and René Rast's VisitFlorida Racing's No. 90 Cadillac was fifth. Yacamán's No. 20 BAR1 Oreca led PC with a 1:43.164 lap, faster than Wickens' No. 8 Starworks vehicle. Hand's No. 66 Ford paced GTLM with a 1:43.490 lap, 0.053 seconds quicker than Werner's No. 911 Porsche. GTD was led by Paul Miller's Audi of Calderelli with a late 1:47.455 lap, 0.056 seconds faster than Bleekemolen's Riley Mercedes-AMG; Kaz Grala's Change Lamborghini was third. The session had two stoppages. The first was at 13 minutes, when the Risi Ferrari leaked oil on the track. Emmanuel Anassis' DAC Lamborghini caused the second stoppage with a left-rear tire failure caused by low air pressure, destroying the car against the turn-one barrier; the car was moved to the pit lane on a flatbed truck. The IMSA allowed DAC to switch to a 2016 O'Gara Motorsports display Lamborghini.

Qualifying results
Provisional pole positions in each class are denoted in bold.  All Prototype and Prototype Challenge cars were grouped together on the starting grid, regardless of qualifying position.

Race

Start and early hours
Dario Franchitti, triple Indianapolis 500 and 2008 24 Hours of Daytona champion, ordered the drivers to start their engines. The green flag was waved by honorary starter Hurley Haywood at 2:30 pm on January 28 to start the race, led by Barbosa in pole position. All 55 cars started, and Barbosa maintained the lead for AER with Johnny Mowlem taking the PC lead from Performance Tech's entry. The first full-course caution was deployed on lap five, when Mul crashed the Change Lamborghini into the left-side tire barrier at turn five (the West Horseshoe) after going onto the right-side grass (sustaining left-front damage); safety crews were needed to extricate the car from the wall. When racing resumed eight minutes later, Cameron overtook his teammate Barbosa on the inside at the Bus Stop chicane after 16 laps. Ricky Taylor's fast pace moved WTR from fourth to second by the end of the first hour, as French retook the PC lead from Mowlem.

Taylor's pace for WTR promoted him to the overall lead when he overtook Barbosa's AER Cadillac during the second hour, and Lindsey passed Christina Nielsen's No. 63 Risi Ferrari to lead GTD. Scott Pruett lost control of 3GT's No. 14 Lexus leaving turn one, went across the road in front of Tommy Milner's No. 4 Corvette, and struck the left pit-lane exit barrier head-on. No other car was involved in the incident, which triggered the second caution. Pruett exited the car unaided, was transported to the infield care center, and was later released. The Lexus was retired with severe damage. Behind the safety car which led the field for 20 minutes, the Rebellion Oreca's hold on fourth place was relinquished when Jani brought the car into the garage for eleven laps to have the engine drive-by-wire throttle motor switched. After racing resumed, Tom Long tried to return to the circuit in the flow of traffic after a pit stop in the No. 70 Mazda; he and the left front of Gordon's brake-locking WTR Cadillac collided in the International Horseshoe turn. The accident lost WTR the lead to Morris' WER car, and they fell into third. Long was penalized one minute and received a stop-and-go-penalty. The GTD class lead was taken by Jules Gounon's Land Audi from Lindsey's Park Place Porsche.

After Morris' error at the first chicane and near-collision with a GTD-category Lamborghini, Eric Curran's WER car stalled in the pit lane after Curran relieved Morris, and it was moved to the garage for troubleshooting. It was demoted to third overall as Fittipaldi took the lead, with Gordon relieved by WTR's second-place Max Angelelli. A third caution was needed when John Falb's No. 8 Starworks PC Oreca car tried to lap McMurry's Park Place Porsche entering the Bus Stop chicane; the cars collided, striking the tire barrier. The Porsche was retired, and Falb entered the pit lane for repairs. McMurry was treated at the infield medical center and released. Falb was deemed responsible for the accident, assessed an eight-minute stop-and-go penalty, and was summoned to race control. Curran returned to the lead during the pit-stop cycle when teammate Fittipaldi's rear bodywork was replaced due to rear-light failure, but later lost it to Angelelli.

Night
As night fell, Mike Gausch lost control of PR1/Mathiasen's Ligier car in the International Horseshoe corner and was avoided by Curran's race-leading WER car and Angelelli's WTR Cadillac. GTD was a multi-car battle, with the lead changing several times among manufacturers over the next few hours. The Risi Ferrari had an anxious moment when it and the No. 991 TRG Porsche collided, under-braking for the Bus Stop chicane, but continued without losing the GTLM lead. James Dayson's No. 88 Starworks PC Oreca entry was being passed by Curran's WER Cadillac on the outside on the bank when they collided. Dayson crashed into the inside barrier, sustaining right-side suspension damage which hampered his return to the pit lane before he was moved by a recovery vehicle. The accident required a fourth caution for extensive cleanup; Curran, who continued driving with minor damage, led at the restart. Angelelli overtook Curran to return the WTR Cadillac to the overall lead.

Fässler's fourth-place No. 4 GTLM Corvette was hit from behind by Harry Tincknell's No. 69 Ford, and spun into the infield grass. The No. 4 Corvette had a power shutdown on the bank, causing Fässler to stop on the inside of the back straightaway leaving the second turn. A fifth caution was needed for the Corvette's recovery to the pit lane. During the caution, Conway's WER Cadillac was forced behind the pit-lane wall with a starter-motor problem which required a push start after two refueling stops. Light rain began during the sixth hour, increasing in intensity, and several teams brought their cars into the pit lane for wet-weather tires. When racing resumed, WTR's Jordan Taylor drove on dry tires which lost temperature (and pressure) during the caution. Taylor relinquished the lead to Filipe Albuquerque's Mustang Sampling car after a pit stop for wet-weather tires. In the seventh hour, Cooper MacNeil's No. 50 Riley Mercedes ceded the GTD lead when a flat tire damaged its right front-wheel suspension components and it was sent to the garage to check for further damage.

A sixth, over-20-minute caution was needed when Kyle Masson lost control of the PC-category leading Performance Tech car at the International Horseshoe turn in front of Conway, who avoided him. Masson restarted his vehicle without trouble, leaving no debris and keeping the PC lead. GTLM was another multi-car battle, with representatives of each of the five manufacturers close together on the same lap. Vilander's Risi Ferrari became the new GTLM leader, ahead of Sébastien Bourdais' No. 66 Ford, after pit stops. Conway lost the WER Cadillac's second place overall to Jordan Taylor's WTR entry when he ran wide at the first turn. The WER vehicle was later forced into the garage for six laps to repair steering wheel and suspension damage from its fifth-hour accident with Dayson by replacing the right front toe link. ESM's No. 22 Nissan of Hartley and (later) Bruno Senna took the lead when Ricky Taylor's WTR Cadillac slowed and Mustang Sampling repaired a faulty rear brake light by replacing the car's rear end.

Land's Audi of Connor De Phillippi ceded the GTD lead to Core's No. 54 Porsche of Colin Braun when a flat right rear tire, due to accumulated debris, forced it to make a pit stop. Brett Sandberg's Change Lamborghini then struck the Bus Stop chicane exit barrier, causing the seventh caution. After the 20-minute caution, Kanaan lapped quickly in the wet conditions and moved the No. 69 Ford from seventh to second in GTLM. 3GT's sole remaining Lexus of Dominik Farnbacher bowed out of the battle for the GTD lead when it made an unscheduled pit stop for a replacement door after a right rear tire failure on the bank destroyed the car's right rear. An eighth caution was needed when Hartley, in the second-place No. 22 ESM Nissan, failed to generate tire temperature on the wet track and ran onto the grass at both hairpins. He hit the side of Wolf Henzler's No. 991 Porsche leaving turn six, spinning him sideways into the outside barrier on the bank. Hartley could not steer due to damage, and stopped on the entrance to the Bus Stop chicane for recovery to the pit lane on a flatbed truck. This moved Barbosa's Mustang Sampling Cadillac up to second overall, a lap behind WTR's Ricky Taylor.

When racing resumed, Mies moved the Land Audi past the No. 93 MSR Acura of Andy Lally for the GTD class lead. Briscoe's No. 67 Ford sustained rear-wing damage against the barrier at the exit of the Bus Stop chicane after he lost control, and went to the garage for repairs. At half distance, Angelelli's WTR Cadillac led overall ahead of VisitFlorida's entry of Rast; Performance Tech led in PC. Estre took the GTLM lead halfway through the 11th hour in Porsche's No. 912 RSR from his teammate Pilet's No. 911 car to counter Ford's strategy switch; MSR's Acura of Jeff Segal led in GTD, with De Phillipi lapping about three seconds faster in Land's second-place Audi. The ninth caution was issued when Nic Jönsson was apparently hit from behind by an Audi on the entry to the Bus Stop chicane, and his car's left corner was damaged by the barrier. The car was retired due to damage after a garage inspection. Jönsson was unhurt; he was checked at the medical center and released.

After racing resumed, Angelelli received a drive-through penalty after his refueler inserted the fueling nozzle before the fire extinguisher was moved over the pit-lane wall; this dropped the WTR car to second, and promoted Rast's VisitFlorida car to the lead. Increasing rainfall prompted officials to issue a 10th, 54-minute caution. Shortly after racing resumed, MacNeil lost control of Riley's No. 50 Mercedes exiting the second corner, damaging its left front suspension against the inside barrier and prompting the 11th caution. The Mercedes was retired due to heavy damage. Just before a 12th caution (when Trent Hindman's No. 26 BAR Oreca PC-class car stopped in the Bus Stop chicane), WTR's Angelelli retook the lead from Rast's VisitFlorida entry and Porsche's speed in the rain moved Werner's No. 911 car into the GTLM lead. WER's Curran's dropped out of contention for victory when he entered the garage for shifter repairs.

Morning to afternoon
In the early morning a 13th caution was deployed for one hour and 42 minutes due to heavy rain just before the Risi Ferrari of James Calado overtook Werner's No. 911 Porsche to lead in GTLM. The long caution meant that the Audi R8 safety car was running low on fuel and had to be replaced by a Porsche Cayenne until the Audi was refueled; teams were notified by race control that there would be no race stoppage due to the caution, but standing water made racing unsafe. French had an anxious moment when he lost control of the PC leading Performance Tech car at the International Horseshoe turn, but he recovered without losing the category lead. Marc Goossens' VisitFlorida entry took the lead during the caution when Ricky Taylor made a troubled pit stop in WTR's Cadillac which refused to start; Goossens lost the lead to Albuquerque's Mustang Sampling car at the restart. Ricky Taylor passed Albuquerue for the lead before VisitFlorida's car of Renger van der Zande was issued a drive-through penalty for repeatedly shortcutting the Bus Stop chicane after IMSA race director Beaux Barfield told teams thaqt it was unacceptable.

David Cheng's damaged No. 26 BAR1 Oreca PC car lost its front bodywork exiting the Western Horseshoe turn, prompting the 14th caution as Buddy Rice's No. 20 BAR1 entry entered the garage for rear body repairs. Bourdais returned the No. 66 Ford GT to the GTLM lead, and WTR regained the lead it lost to Barbosa when Angelelli passed the Mustang Sampling Cadillac. The fourth-place No. 2 ESM Nissan of Sharp crashed into an infield advertising hoarding which was on the track. A 15th caution was issued when Jack Hawksworth crashed the No. 15 3GT Lexus into the outside tire barrier at turn six and continued driving. Vilander moved the Risi Ferrari past Hand's No. 66 Ford and Antonio García's No. 3 Corvette for the GTLM lead before he was closed in on when the track dried. Several teams began to install dry tires on their cars in the pit lane when a dry line began to emerge on the track, making them faster than the wet surface did. Angelelli had an anxious moment when he struck a damp curb and lost control of WTR's Cadillac entering the Bus Stop chicane, but retained his lead over Barbosa.

In the 21st hour, Chris Cumming caused the 16th caution when he spun the No. 8 Starworks PC car into the inside barrier leaving the first corner and retired. A 17th caution was issued when Trent Hindman spun the No. 26 BAR1 car on cold tires during his out-lap entering the first turn. He crashed into the tire wall, and continued by reversing. Hanley's DragonSpeed Oreca lost most of its rear bodywork in the Bus Stop chicane, triggering the 18th caution. Bird moved Scuderia Corsa's Ferrari to the GTD lead before its engine failed at the inside exit of turn six, prompting a 19th caution. The Ferrari's retirement gave Gounon's Land Audi the class lead. Michael Christensen's No. 28 Alegra Porsche joined the battle in GTD, led by Riley's No. 33 Mercedes of Bleekemolen from Lally's No. 93 MSR Acura. Ricky Taylor's WTR and Mustang Sampling's Albuquerque dueled for the overall lead and Hand moved the No. 66 Ford back to first in GTLM.

A 20th caution was triggered after the radiator duct on Lally's No. 93 MSR Acura detached from the hood and landed on the circuit, overheating the gearbox and forcing it into the pit lane. Ricky Taylor and Albquerque continued to battle for the win when racing resumed, and García's No. 3 Corvette took the lead in GTLM after a pit-stop cycle before losing out to Müller's No. 66 Ford and Calado's Risi Ferrari. Riley's No. 33 Mercedes led the GTD before it was passed by De Phillipi's Land Audi and Christensen's Alegra Porsche due to poor grip. The 21st (and final) caution was needed when Lally stopped the No. 93 MSR Acura on the infield grass near the entrance of turn five due to a loss of power and needed recovering. When racing continued, Ricky Taylor was second and unsuccessfully tried to pass Albuquerque on the outside at the first infield hairpin. He tried again while braking into turn one; the WTR Cadillac's right front hit the Mustang Sampling car's left rear, moving Taylor to the lead and making Albuquerque spin. Race control investigated the collision, but took no action against Taylor.

Finish
Taylor maintained the lead under pressure from Albuquerque for WTR's second Daytona win by 0.671 seconds after 659 laps. The VisitFlorida Riley car, slower in dry weather than in wet conditions, was the highest-placed LMP2 entry in third. The battle in GTLM continued until the final hour, as Müller's No. 66 Ford gave CGR victory by 2.988 seconds over Pilet's No. 911 Porsche; Pilet failed repeatedly to overtake Müller into the first turn and overstressed his Porsche's tires. The Risi Ferrari completed the GTLM podium in third, with Calado 0.091 seconds behind Pilet as the latter slowed on the last lap. The final 514 laps of the last PC race at Daytona were led by Performance Tech's Oreca FLM09, which finished 22 laps over the second-place No. 2 BAR1 team in its first IMSA victory and class win since the 2013 Baltimore Sports Car Challenge. The GTD duel lasted until the final hour, when Christensen's strategy to stop for fuel in the final hour and conserve it during the last caution sent him past Mies' Land Audi for Alegras' first Daytona class win since 2007 by 0.293 seconds. Bleekemolen's No. 50 Riley Motorsport's car was third in GTD in Mercedes' maiden IMSA event.

After the race
Albuquerque expressed his displeasure with the late-race collision with Ricky Taylor which cost AER the overall victory: "If he's a true racer who did a mistake, just back off. Wait, don't leave. And he left! A true racer, in my opinion, in the end, deep inside, I'd feel a little bit ashamed of the win." Ricky Taylor defended WTR's race-winning pass: "Obviously I'd been working on it for a while, looking at where we were strong, and it's the 24 Hours so everybody is going to take a risk. I don't understand what he says about closing the door and getting hit. If you get enough alongside, you can make it work. I think he saw me coming, he saw me committing and, like he said, he closed the door." Rast admitted being surprised to finish on the podium, given VisitFlorida's lack of preparation for the event: "We actually expected to stop in our garage after 50 minutes, because we didn't know how long the car will last. We were counting the laps, because our longest run before was maybe 10 or 11 laps. We never did 20 [laps] or 1 hour in a row, so we didn't know what to expect, but the car was just running and running without any big issues."

Bourdais and Hand paid tribute to their teammate, Müller, for passing García's Corvette and Calado's Ferrari and fending off Pilet's Porsche to secure the No. 66 Ford team victory in GTLM. Müller described the race's final two hours as "nerve-racking": "Ferrari and Porsche really turned it up at the end. They were so much faster on the straight all of a sudden. I just had to stick to my line and cover myself. I really enjoyed racing again Patrick [Pilet] and James Calado. I think that was one of the best GT races you could have seen, that you coulda dreamed of." Alegra team owner and racer Carlos de Quesada said that he was proud to give young drivers the opportunity to showcase their abilities at Daytona: "I like helping young kids. I watched the kids grow up through karting, watching my son, and I remember Daniel racing. We'd do all the winter tours and everything. And just that dream, the hopes of kids trying to get to the next level, and so I tried to do what I can."

Christensen said, "It's really tough just to keep it on track, and yeah, our plan was to stay on the lead lap and have a perfect race car for the end of the race." Gounon said that the reason Land Motorsports did not win in GTD was because IMSA installed a smaller fuel restrictor on their Audi which lengthened their pit stops. Performance Tech team principal Brent O'Neill called his team's PC class win "really special": "There were a lot of people after the Roar that didn't think that our car was going to be winning any races any time soon, but here we are. This was good for the whole team. It was a great morale booster as we head into the rest of the season." Atherton said that three of the four categories seeing race-long battles demonstrated the effectiveness of IMSA's Technical Committee getting their calculations correct when establishing regulations and restrictions: "While we recognize it will always be a topic of great debate, we believe it was extremely fair and equitable for all involved."

This was the season's first round, and Angelelli, Gordon and the Taylor brothers led the Prototype Drivers' Championship with 35 points, ahead of Albuquerue, Barbosa and Fittipaldi by three points. Nicholas Boulle, French, Masson and O'Ward led the PC points standings, ahead of Cheng, Hindman, Adam Merzon, Mowlem and Tom Papadopoulos. Bourdais, Hand and Müller held the GTLM Drivers' Championship lead over Frédéric Makowiecki, Pilet and Werner. In GTD, Christensen, Carlos de Quesada, Michael de Quesada, Jesse Lazare and Daniel Morad led the class points standings over De Phillipi, Gounon, Mies and Jeffery Schmidt. WTR, Performance Tech, CGR and Alegra led their respective Teams' Championships, and Cadillac, Ford and Porsche led their respective Manufacturers' Championships with 11 rounds remaining in the season.

Results
Class winners are denoted in bold.  P stands for Prototype, PC (Prototype Challenge), GTLM (Grand Touring Le Mans) and GTD (Grand Touring Daytona).

Post-race championship standings

 Note: Only the top five positions are included for all sets of standings.

 Note: Only the top five positions are included for all sets of standings.

 Note: Only the top five positions are included for all sets of standings.

Notes

References

External links
 Unofficial Results

24 Hours of Daytona
24 Hours of Daytona
24 Hours of Daytona
24 Hours of Daytona